Húrin is a fictional character in the Middle-earth legendarium of J. R. R. Tolkien. He is introduced in The Silmarillion as a hero of Men during the First Age, said to be the greatest warrior of both the Edain and all the other Men in Middle-earth.

Fictional history 

Húrin is the elder son of Galdor the Tall of the House of Hador and Hareth of the Men of Haladin, who are Edain; he has a younger brother named Huor.

Huor and Húrin live with their uncle Haldir in Beleriand, when they join a war party against the Orcs. The brothers end up in the Vale of Sirion, and are cut off from their company and chased by Orcs. The Vala of Water causes a mist to arise from the river, and the brothers escape. Then two Eagles pick them up, and bring them to Gondolin. King Turgon welcomes them, remembering Ulmo's prophecy that the House of Hador will aid Gondolin in its time of greatest need. Turgon wants them to remain, as he grows to love them, but the brothers wish to return to their kin. They swear an oath to keep Gondolin secret, and the Eagles bring them back to Dor-lómin.

Later Morgoth assails Hithlum, and Húrin's father Galdor falls defending the Barad Eithel. Húrin chases the Orcs away. He then takes the Lordship of his people.

Soon he marries Morwen, and then their son Túrin is born. A daughter Lalaith follows, but she dies very young.

Later when they go to battle with Morgoth Húrin rides his horse Arroch, 'Noble horse', to the battle and fights alongside his brother, Huor. In the midst of battle he meets Turgon again. After they lose the battle, Húrin and Huor take a stand fighting off the Orcs, allowing Turgon to escape. Huor and most of their soldiers are killed, but Húrin fights with his battle-axe until his axe withers, and he is buried under a mountain of dead Orcs and Trolls. Húrin is then bound alive by Gothmog Lord of Balrogs who brings him to Angband.

Morgoth then tries to force Húrin to reveal where Gondolin is. When Húrin refuses, Morgoth curses him along with his kin and puts him on a high mountain peak in chains. Through the power of Morgoth, he can see and hear from the seat all the evils that later befall his son Túrin and daughter Nienor. He sees only those things that Morgoth wishes to reveal, lessening their good deeds. Húrin is thus embittered even more by the way his children, both under the spells of a dragon, come to marry each other, conceive a child and commit suicide.

After twenty-eight years of imprisonment and the death of his children, Húrin is released by Morgoth. "He had grown grim to look upon: his hair and beard were white and long, but there was a fell light in his eyes. He walked unbowed, and yet carried a great black staff; but he was girt with a sword." He is brought to his old homelands, but enemies are living there.

Seven outlaws under Asgon join Húrin, and together they go to the Vale of Sirion. Húrin abandons his followers and seeks the entrance to Gondolin, but it is closed, and Turgon does not wish to allow him in. Húrin cries out against Turgon, revealing the location of Gondolin to Morgoth's spies, and leaves. Only after he leaves does Turgon have a change of heart and send Eagles to fetch him, but they come too late and do not find him.

Húrin continues to the forest of Brethil where his son and daughter died, and meets his wife Morwen there at their grave, just before she dies. In anger and despair he seeks out the Folk of Haleth, blaming them for the death of his wife and children, and causes a revolt that kills the last Haladin. Hardang the Chieftain of Brethil fears and dishonours Húrin, imprisoning and trying to kill him. Húrin's cause is defended by Manthor, and they manage to set the Folk of Brethil against Hardang and kill him. Manthor himself is killed, and guesses the will of Húrin: "Was not this your true errand, Man of the North: to bring ruin upon us to weigh against thine own?"

Húrin meets up again with the outlaws, and together they go to Nargothrond, where Húrin kills the dwarf who claimed the treasure of the dragon who caused the suffering of Hurin's children, earning a curse on the gold. Húrin and his outlaws bring the treasure, including the Nauglamír, to Doriath, insulting Thingol by giving it as a fee for his 'good care' of Húrin's kin. Húrin thus brings a curse on Doriath as well, leading to its downfall.

Melian, a Maia and the queen of Doriath, uses kind words to break through to Húrin's clouded mind, and Húrin finally sees that all his deeds had only aided Morgoth. A broken man, he is rumoured to have cast himself in the sea and killed himself. That is the end of Húrin, who had been known as the "mightiest of the warriors of mortal men".

Analysis

Effects 

The Tolkien scholar Tom Shippey writes that the "lyric core" of the story of the fall of Gondolin is the scene where Húrin is set free after 28 years imprisoned by Morgoth. In his view, "everything in this scene is emblematic"; the sun sets behind the Mountains of Shadow, standing for the coming catastrophe, but "the real sunset is in Húrin's heart". 

Christopher Garbowski writes in the J.R.R. Tolkien Encyclopedia that the depiction of Húrin in The War of the Jewels, crying aloud in the wilderness where the hidden entrance to Gondolin once stood, creates a very different effect to that of The Lord of the Rings which had already been written. The Vala Manwe sends an eagle to Turgon for help, but the account seems, writes Garbowski, to allow no time for the message to arrive; he calls Shippey's description of the scene, a "posed tableau", apt.

Fate and free will 

The Tolkien scholar Helen Lasseter Freeh notes that the longer version of the tale of Túrin Turambar in Unfinished Tales (the Narn) contains a dialogue between Morgoth and Húrin about fate and providence. Despite his imprisonment, Húrin insists that Morgoth cannot control everything, and while Morgoth does not directly contradict this, he says he will spread a "cloud of Doom" on everyone Húrin loves, and "wherever they go, evil shall arise". Túrin lives a life of disaster, in which Freeh sees the hand of fate, which threatens to overwhelm Túrin's free will. Shippey comments that Morgoth is one of the Valar, whose power in the world appears as luck, or chance, or fate. Terrible things in the Narn seem to be coincidences; but, writes Shippey, Tolkien often gives "double explanations" of these events, one fate, one just accident.

Descent of Húrin

See also 
 The Lay of the Children of Húrin, an early alliterative poem telling of the tragic life of Húrin's son Túrin.

Notes

References

Primary
This list identifies each item's location in Tolkien's writings.

Secondary

Sources

  
  
    
    
    

Middle-earth Edain
Characters in The Silmarillion
Characters in The Children of Húrin
Fictional sole survivors
Fictional suicides
Literary characters introduced in 1977